The Kelantan State Legislative Assembly is the unicameral state legislature of the Malaysian state of Kelantan. It consists of 45 members representing single-member constituencies throughout the state. Elections are held no more than five years apart.

The State Legislative Assembly convenes at the Kota Darul Naim in the state capital, Kota Bharu.

Current composition

Seating arrangement

Role
The Kelantan State Legislative Assembly enacts legislation concerning matters in the State List and Joint List defined in the Federal Constitution. The Speaker presides over debates in the Assembly.

The leader of the majority party or coalition in the Assembly is appointed Menteri Besar by the Sultan of Kelantan. The person who assumes the role of Menteri Besar appoints the state's executive council, or EXCO (Majlis Mesyuarat Kerajaan), drawing from members of the Assembly.

Committees
The Assembly contains two administrative committees, namely:
Public Accounts Committee
Select Committee

Election pendulum
The 14th General Election witnessed 37 governmental seats and 8 non-governmental seats filled the Kelantan State Legislative Assembly. The government side has 6 safe seats and 5 fairly safe seats. However, none of the non-government side has safe and fairly safe seat.

List of Assemblies

See also
 List of State Seats Representatives in Malaysia
 State legislative assemblies of Malaysia

References

External links
 Kelantan State Government official website

 
K
Unicameral legislatures
Politics of Kelantan